The Mandalay City Development Committee (abbreviated MCDC) is the administrative body of Mandalay, the second largest city in Myanmar (Burma). MCDC has wide-ranging responsibilities, including city planning, land administration, tax collection, and urban development. MCDC raises its own revenues through tax collection, fees, licenses and property development. MCDC's chairman acts as Mayor of Mandalay, and sits as Regional Minister for the Government of Mandalay Region.  MCDC's mission is to make the city clean, to keep the city beautiful, and to enable city dwellers to enjoy a pleasant life.

History

MCDC was established first established by the State Law and Order Restoration Council's 1992 City of Mandalay Development Law. In 2002, the said law was repealed by State Peace and Development Council and replaced with the 2002 City of Mandalay Development Law. Mandalay Region Hluttaw enacted the new MCDC law in 2014 December. MCDC was formed by the Mandalay Regional Government, and legally comprises 13 to 15 members, including a Chairman who acts as the Minister (Mayor), and a Vice-Chairman, who acts as the Vice-Mayor.

Departments 
 Administration Department
 Motor Transport & Workshop Department
 Market and Slaughter House Department
 Finance Department
 Revenue Department
 Cleansing Department
 Playgrounds, Parks and Gardens Department
 Building and Central Stores Department
 Roads and Bridges Department
 Water and Sanitation Department
 Urban Planning and Land Administration Department
 Public Relations and Information Department
 Inspection Department
 Agriculture and Livestock Breeding Department

Projects
In 2017, the Mandalay City Development Committee approved a public-private partnership with Mandalay Business Capital City Development Company (MBCCD), owned by Maung Weik, for a 10-year mega-development project in Amarapura, projected to include hotels, hospitals, schools, jetties, shopping centres, gardens and apartment buildings on a plot of  allocated by the Mandalay city government.

Gallery

See also
Mandalay
Mandalay Region
Mayor of Mandalay

Yangon City Development Committee
Naypyidaw Development Committee
Mandalay Convention Centre

References

Government agencies of Myanmar
Mandalay